Te Hura Te Taiwhakaripi  (fl. 1861–1866) was a notable New Zealand tribal leader. Of Māori descent, he identified with the Ngāti Awa iwi. He was active from about 1861.

References

1866 deaths
Ngāti Awa people
Year of birth missing